Ta13oo (stylized TA13OO and pronounced Taboo) is the third studio album by American rapper Denzel Curry. It was released on July 27, 2018, through PH Recordings and distributed by Loma Vista Recordings. The album serves as the follow-up to Curry's second studio album, Imperial, released in 2016, and the 13 EP, released in 2017. Ta13oo features guest appearances from Twelve'len, GoldLink, Nyyjerya, JID, JPEGMafia, ZillaKami, and additional vocals by Billie Eilish. Production was handled by FnZ, DJ Dahi, Ronny J, Illmind, Charlie Heat, and Mickey de Grand IV, among others.

Ta13oo was supported by five singles: "Sumo", "Percs", "Clout Cobain", "Vengeance", and "Black Balloons". The album received widespread acclaim from critics.

Background
In an interview with Zane Lowe, Denzel Curry described the structure of the album: "I was in a dark space when I was working on the dark part. I was tryna work on the light part when I was working toward my happiness."

A statement accompanying the music video to "Clout Cobain" stated: "Across the three sections of Ta13oo, Denzel explores topics including molestation, the presidential election, fame, hatred, paranoia, revenge, love, the current state of music and personal tales of his own near-death experiences. Sonically, the album ranges just as widely as its subject matter, sounds of paranoia, fear of loss, brooding melancholy and mood swings straight from hell all find their way onto Ta13oo."

Release and promotion
The first single, "Sumo", was released on March 30, 2018 for streaming and digital download. The second single, "Percs", was released on May 25, 2018. The third single, "Clout Cobain", was released on July 12, 2018, alongside a music video. "Black Balloons" and "Cash Maniac" were made available for digital download as promotional singles on July 23 and 24, 2018.

The album was released as three acts consecutively between July 25 and 27, 2018, with the album released in its totality on July 27, 2018. Subsequently, "Vengeance" was released as a single on September 5, 2018, while "Black Balloons" was promoted on March 27, 2019.

Critical reception

Ta13oo was met with widespread critical acclaim. At Metacritic, which assigns a normalized rating out of 100 to reviews from professional publications, the album received an average score of 86, based on six reviews.

Marshall Gu of Pretty Much Amazing wrote, "Ultimately, easily one of the most simultaneously hardest and atmospheric hip-hop albums of the year". In his review for HipHopDX, Justin Ivey praised the album, writing, "Curry has constructed a project that plays to the sonic structures of the era without sacrificing meaningful content in doing so. TA13OO is the culmination of his promise and talent, resulting in Curry's magnum opus". Sputnikmusic's critic Jordan M. said, "Realistically, Ta13oo is extremely satisfying from a consumption standpoint. It's everything I'd want from a rap album this year". Concluding his review for AllMusic, Neil Z. Yeung stated that "With this additional substance and strategic guest contributions, Curry is elevated on TA13OO -- despite this deep dive into despair and darkness -- hinting at more insight on future efforts".

In a positive review, Dean Van Nguyen of Pitchfork wrote that "It's when he sticks to the highly personal that Curry's music is devoid of all cliché—the power of his performance, the veracity of his pen, and the color of his wordplay make him an expert at voicing the tribulations of this doomed condition we call being young. All of this makes him impossible to place in the broader SoundCloud rap domain. Signs point to an artist who will outlast any single distribution platform—or any of the genres named for them". Trey Alston of Highsnobiety gave the album a favorable review, writing, "To call it psychedelic is a cliché, but the album is a multi-part, constantly-moving, collection of harsh emotions with a funky twist that works, even if the final leg slows down the momentum a tad".

Year-end lists

Track listing 
Credits were adapted from the album's liner notes.

Notes
  signifies an additional producer
 All tracks stylized in all caps.
 "Taboo" features background vocals by Tish Hyman and VSC
 "Black Balloons" features background vocals by Savannah Cristina and Mickey de Grand IV, and additional vocals by Nathan Burgess and Illeana Cardenas
 "Cash Maniac" and "Vengeance" feature additional vocals by Mickey de Grand IV
 "Sirens" features additional vocals by Billie Eilish
 "The Blackest Balloon" features additional vocals by Soulja Mook
 "Black Metal Terrorist" features additional vocals by Gino Vento

Charts

References 

2018 albums
Denzel Curry albums
Albums produced by DJ Dahi
Albums produced by Ronny J
Loma Vista Recordings albums